E111 may be:
 A European medical form now replaced by the European Health Insurance Card
 Orange GGN, a food additive, classified under E110 in the European Union
 The DB Class 111 locomotive
 Roentgenium, element 111 in the periodic table